The sixth season of The Bachelorette, an ABC reality television series, premiered on May 24, 2010. This season featured 25-year-old Ali Fedotowsky, an advertising account manager from Williamstown, Massachusetts. Fedotowsky finished in fourth place on season 14 of The Bachelor featuring Jake Pavelka, after she eliminated herself due to a work-related ultimatum.

The season concluded on August 2, 2010, with Fedotowsky accepting a proposal from 26-year-old insurance agent Roberto Martinez. Martinez is the first male Latino winner in The Bachelorette. The couple ended their relationship on November 21, 2011.

Contestants

Future appearances

The Bachelor
Fedotowsky and Roberto Martinez appeared in one episode on the fifteenth season of The Bachelor where they gave an advice for the contestants of that season.

Bachelor Pad
Craig McKinnon, Jesse Beck, and Jonathan Novack returned for the first season of Bachelor Pad. McKinnon was eliminated during week 2. Novack during week 3. Beck and his partner, Peyton Wright, were eliminated at the end of week 5, finishing in 4th place.

Justin Rego, Kasey Kahl, and Kirk DeWindt returned for the second season of Bachelor Pad. Rego was eliminated during week 1. DeWindt and his partner, Ella Nolan, were eliminated at the beginning of week 6, finishing in 4th place. Kahl and his partner, Vienna Girardi, were eliminated at the end of week 6, finishing in 3rd place.

Bachelor in Paradise
DeWindt returned for the second season of Bachelor in Paradise. He split from his partner, Carly Waddell, during week 6.

Call-out order

 The contestant received the first impression rose
 The contestant was voted off by the other contestants but got a rose instead
 The contestant received a rose during a date
 The contestant was eliminated
 The contestant was eliminated during a date
 The contestant was disqualified from the show
 The contestant quit the competition
 The contestant received the final rose of the show

Episodes

Post-show
Just a year and a half after the engagement, Ali and Roberto officially broke up after numerous wedding delays.

After Ali and Roberto broke up, Ali and Frank went on a date, and were romantic for a night. However, they realized they were not right for each other.

Ali married Kevin Manno on March 3, 2017. Ali and Kevin have two children together, Molly Sullivan (born July 6, 2016) and Riley Doran (born May 24, 2018).

References

External links
 

2010 American television seasons
The Bachelorette (American TV series) seasons
Television shows filmed in California
Television shows shot in the Las Vegas Valley
Television shows filmed in New York City
Television shows filmed in Iceland
Television shows filmed in Turkey
Television shows filmed in Portugal
Television shows filmed in Florida
Television shows filmed in Massachusetts
Television shows filmed in Wisconsin
Television shows filmed in Illinois
Television shows filmed in French Polynesia